Geist is a fictional character in the DC Comics universe. He was created by Chuck Dixon and Jim Balent.

Fictional character biography
First appearing in Detective Comics Annual #6 (1993), Dwayne Geyer is given superpowers during the Bloodlines crossover. After being bitten by the alien Pritor, Geist is able to become invisible. He becomes less visible in dim lighting and completely invisible in bright light. This is useful in fighting crime but makes it impossible for him to hold down a job. Using his newfound powers he helps Batman (Jean Paul Valley) defeat one of the spine-sucking aliens attacking Gotham City.

He also helps fight the spawn of the Bloodlines monsters. This involves most of the newly created heroes responding to a telepathic call; they rescue the veteran heroes from the Bloodlines spawn and all end up participating in the successful effort to destroy it. Geist next joins the Blood Pack and fights valiantly helping them defeat the Quorum. Geist leaves the team after finding out he is only a member due to a clerical error.

Infinite Crisis
After leaving the Blood Pack, Geist largely retires from super-heroics. He is briefly seen midway through the Infinite Crisis series, attending a mass for fallen and missing heroes. Later, in the Villains United one-shot special, he is contacted by the Oracle while drinking in a bar. Informed the Secret Society of Super Villains is attacking Metropolis, Geist suits up to defend the city.  He joins with other former members of the Blood Pack, along with dozens of other heroes, in a defense line outside the city. Together, the Blood Pack fights Solomon Grundy. Geist is killed in Infinite Crisis #7. While fighting Grundy, Superboy-Prime fires a blast of heat vision at members of the Blood Pack. Geist, Grundy, and those members of the Blood Pack present at that time are killed.

Final Crisis
Geist is seen with dozens of other forgotten heroes, such as Ace the Bat-Hound and fellow New Blood hero Gunfire. They are all stuck in a self-described 'Limbo', where no stories happen. They are rescued by Superman and a dimension crossing ship. Later, all of them assist against the cosmic threat of Mandrakk.

Blackest Night
In Adventure Comics (vol. 2) #4, Geist is reanimated as a member of the Black Lantern Corps. Superboy-Prime destroyed Geist on Earth Prime, using the black ring cycling through the power set of the resulting in a burst of colored energy that destroys Black Lanterns.

Powers and abilities
After receiving a bite from the alien Pritor, Geist gains the ability to become completely invisible in bright light. By concentrating extremely hard, he can cause objects he is touching to become invisible as well. A negative side effect of his new power is that he is very sensitive to light, and can be blinded by very bright lights (even when his eyes are closed).

In other media
 Geist (named as Dwayne Geist instead of Dwayne Geyer) was mentioned in The Flash,  where he was one of the former metahuman criminals killed by Cicada in the episode Seeing Red.

External links
DCU Guide: Geist

References

Comics characters introduced in 1993
DC Comics superheroes
DC Comics metahumans
Fictional characters who can turn invisible